Mieczysław Warmus (born June 1, 1918 in Dobrowlany, d. September 20, 2007 in Australia) was a Polish mathematician, a pioneer of computer science in Poland, professor, university lecturer, author of over a hundred scientific papers.

References
Homepage
Biography (Prof. Mieczysław Warmus (1918–2007))
Biography (Jadwiga Dutkiewicz Mieczysław Warmus Życie i praca naukowa )

20th-century Polish mathematicians
1918 births
2007 deaths